Pike Road is a town in Montgomery County, Alabama, United States. As of the 2020 census, the population was 9,439, up from 5,406 at the 2010 census. It is part of the Montgomery metropolitan area.

Pike Road was founded in 1815. Pike Road was incorporated in 1997.

Geography
Pike Road is located in east-central Montgomery County at  (32.269660, -86.140167). It is bordered to the north by the city of Montgomery, the state capital. U.S. Routes 82 and 231 pass through the town together as Troy Highway, which leads northwest  to the center of Montgomery. The two highways diverge southeast of Pike Road, with US 82 leading east-southeast  to Union Springs and US 231 leading south  to Troy.

Government
Pike Road elects a mayor and a five-member town council every four years. The mayor and all council members are elected at-large. Pike Road's current mayor is Gordon Stone.

The current town council members are: Chris Dunn, Angie Bradsher, Chris Myers, Doug Fuhrman and Rob Steindorff. The Pike Road Town Council meets at 7:00 p.m. on the second Monday of each month as well as the fourth Wednesday of every month at 7:00 a.m. Meetings are held in the council chamber at Pike Road Town Hall (9575 Vaughn Road).

The Town of Pike Road, Alabama employs four full-time staff members, two part-time staff members and utilizes contractors to fulfill other staff needs.

Sales tax is 8.75 percent, of which 4 percent goes to the State of Alabama and 2.5 percent goes to Montgomery County. Income tax goes to the United States Government.

The United States Postal Service operates the Pike Road Post Office in the town limits.

Demographics

2010 census
By the time of the 2010 census, there were 5,406 people residing in Pike Road with the town now having 1,933 households, and 1606 families. The town's population grew almost 20-fold since the 2000 census, making it one of the fastest growing incorporated places in Alabama with a population of over 5,000 in 2010.

The 2010 census population profile by race showed 68.5% White, 28.7% Black or African American, 0.1% Native American, 1.4% Asian American, and 1.3% Hispanic or Latino persons of any race living within the town limits. Roughly 0.8% of the population was of two or more races.

2000 census
As of the 2000 census, there were 310 people, 110 households, and 95 families residing in the town. The population has since grown as communities that were unincorporated joined Pike Road.

Education

Primary and secondary schools

In 1918, the residents of Pike Road acquired funds to establish the Pike Road Consolidated School, which opened in 1919. The school closed in 1970.

On December 22, 2010, Pike Road established a municipal school system, Pike Road Schools. On August 13, 2015, the Pike Road Board of Education opened the doors to its first school as part of its own independent school district. This first school, Pike Road School, served kindergarten to 8th-grade students. Overcrowding in the schools was an issue from the onset, as the population growth of the Town out-paced the school board's ability to acquire new school buildings or build their own schools. The district's second school, The Pike Road Historic School was renovated and opened in 2017. Pike Road's third school, Pike Road High School, was established at the Georgia Washington Middle School Campus (acquired from Montgomery Public Schools) in 2018. The high school has a full varsity athletics program which is a member of the Alabama High School Athletics Association.

Public libraries
The Pike Road Public Library of the Montgomery City-County Public Library is located in Pike Road. It is located in the Pike Road Station shopping center near the intersection of Pike and Vaughn Roads.

Notable people
 Mose Tolliver, folk artist, born here and died in Montgomery

References

External links

Pike Road School District

Towns in Alabama
Towns in Montgomery County, Alabama
Montgomery metropolitan area